Joseph Cox Bridge (1853–1929) was an English organist and composer.

Biography
He was born at Rochester, Kent, studied under John Hopkins, and from 1871 to 1876 was organist of Exeter College, Oxford. In 1877 he became organist of Chester Cathedral. There he revived the Chester triennial festival.In 1908, he was appointed Professor of Music at Durham University.

Works
His works include an oratorio, Daniel (1885); a Magnificat and Nunc Dimittis, in C, for voice and orchestra (1879); and considerable organ-music, anthems, and part-songs.

Anthems 

 Be joyful in God

Cantata 

 Resurgam

Part-songs 

 Come, lasses and lads
 Joan to the maypole
 The Cheshire Cheese

Incidental music 

 Dramatised Scenes from "The Pilgrim's Progress," by E.A. Rudd (published in 1912)

Masses 

 Requiem for soloists, chorus and orchestra (published by Ricordi in 1900)

Instrumental music 

 Danses sclave, piano duets
 Various original compositions and arrangements for organ

Notes

References

External links
 
 

1853 births
1929 deaths
English organists
British male organists
English composers
Academics of Durham University